Varadamudra is a mudra, and it indicates a gesture by the hand and symbolizes dispensing of boons. For varadamudra, the right hand is used. It is held out, with palm uppermost and the fingers pointing downwards. Varadamudra and abhayamudra are the most common of several other mudras seen on divine figures in the art of Indian religions. 

Often the open hand is shown with a lotus bud in the centre.

References

Dictionary of Hindu Lore and Legend by Anna Dallapiccola

Buddhist rituals
Hand gestures
Hindu philosophical concepts
Mudras